Alive & Kicking is the fifth and final studio album by American vocal group The Delfonics. It was released via Philly Groove Records in 1974.

Track listing

Personnel
Credits adapted from liner notes.

Musicians
 Major Harris – vocals
 Wilbert Hart – vocals
 William "Poogie" Hart – vocals
 Cotton Kent – keyboards
 Bobby Eli – guitar
 Norman Harris – guitar
 Ronald Baker – bass guitar
 Earl Young – drums

Technical personnel
 Stan Watson – production
 Tony Bell – arrangement
 Vince Montana – arrangement
 Jay Mark – engineering
 Don Murray – engineering
 Beverly Weinstein – art direction
 Joel Brodsky – photography
 Tom Moulton – compilation executive production
 Reid Whitelaw – compilation executive production

Charts

References

External links
 

1974 albums
The Delfonics albums
Albums recorded at Sigma Sound Studios
Philly Groove Records albums